The McGregor Smith Scout Reservation is located in Inverness, Florida, Citrus County, Florida and managed as part of the Southwest Florida Water Management District. The  area was purchased from the Boy Scouts in 2004 and is located at 12650 East Boy Scout Road in Inverness, Florida.

In 2012, the camp was completely closed and dismantled.

References

Defunct local council camps of the Boy Scouts of America
Parks in Citrus County, Florida
Southwest Florida Water Management District reserves
2012 disestablishments in Florida